Arabic tea ((pronounced shay  , is a variety of hot teas popular throughout the Arab world. It is commonly served to guests and business partners at meetings and social events, and has been drunk by Arab people for centuries. It is considered to be a healthy drink largely because boiling water kills off most of the bacteria and viruses that would otherwise cause sickness, and some claim that it offers additional medicinal advantages.

Arab society 
Tea is an important drink in the Arab world and is usually served with breakfast, after lunch, and with dinner. For Arabs, tea denotes hospitality, and is typically served to guests. Tea owes its popularity to its social nature; it is one of the most important aspects of hospitality and business etiquette in Arab culture. Importantly, one should not reject tea when offered, because it may be considered rude.

Varieties 
There are many different types of Arabic tea:

 Sage tea is typically served after a meal to aid in digestion and eliminate gas or heartburn. It has a distinct flavor, and, if brewed without black tea, is non-caffeinated. Homegrown, dried sage leaves are considered best for making sage Arabic tea.
Chamomile tea is made by brewing dried chamomile flowers and has many health benefits, including reducing stress and anxiety, alleviating pain and discomfort, and also improving sleep and insomnia. 
Anise tea has been well known for hundreds of years.
Thyme tea helps improve memory and cleans out the stomach. Rich in antioxidants, this tea is also useful in preventing aging from within.
Cardamom tea is very common in the Arab world, and is known for its strong aroma. It is sometimes mixed with coffee, and is said to help digestion and increase saliva flow. It is drunk before meals to prepare digestive enzymes. Although one of the most expensive spices in the world, cardamom is still largely harvested by hand for many Arab customers.
Maghrebi mint tea (at-tāy): (Maghrebi Arabic:  at-tāy) also known as Moroccan mint tea, is a green tea prepared with spearmint leaves and sugar, traditional to the Maghreb region (the northwest African countries of Morocco, Algeria, Tunisia, Libya, and Mauritania). The tea was originally made by English traders and has spread in popularity throughout Africa, France, and other neighboring countries. Known for its flavor and vitality, the fresh mint used to prepare at-tāy helps to clear the palate after meals.
Mint tea is commonly used to get over colds, a sore throat, sinus congestion, and stomach ulcers. Seasonal allergies can also be treated by drinking cups of tea containing rosemarynic acid: an anti-inflammatory agent found in mint.
Black tea is the most common.
Hibiscus tea is drunk hot in the winter and cold in the summer. Hibiscus tea has a large amount of vitamin C.
Cinnamon tea or Kuwaiti tea is created by putting water in a boiler together with cinnamon sticks and sugar. Cinnamon tea contains many health benefits such as bacterial resistance, diabetes treatment, protection against heart disease, and prevention of colon disorders, as well as containing many antioxidant compounds.
Dried lime tea  also known as chai noomi basra, noomi basra tea or loomi tea, is a type of herbal tea made from dried limes that is traditional to Iraq, Kuwait, Oman and United Arab Emirates.

Served 
Tea in the Arab world is usually a strong dark mix, similar to the so-called "breakfast tea" served in other parts of the world. Often brewed with sugar and served in long glasses, it can also be made with mint or cardamom, or with a dash of milk. In Yemen, black tea is brewed in water and milk.

See also
Arab culture
Arab cuisine
Arabic coffee
Libyan tea
Shahi haleeb
Tea culture
Turkish tea

References

Arab culture
Arab cuisine
Arabic drinks
Tea by country
Tea in Africa
Tea in Asia
Tea culture by country
Arab inventions